Emma Zackrisson (born 26 January 1979) is a former Swedish professional golfer who played on the Ladies European Tour.

Zackrisson played golf at Oklahoma State University 1998–2002 where she majored in broadcast journalism and public relations. In 2002, she received the Edith Cummings Munson Golf Award, an award presented by the National Golf Coaches Association (NGCA) and given to the student-athlete who is both a NGCA All-American Scholar and a NGCA All-American who excels in academics.

Zackrisson attended the LET Qualifying School 2002 and joined the LET 2003. After nine seasons on the Ladies European Tour she retired in 2011 at age 32. Her greatest accomplishment on the tour was winning the 2008 Open de España Femenino,Davies and Zackrisson share lead in Austria, Ladies European Tour, 13 April 2008 other achievements include runner-up in Deutsche Bank Ladies Swiss Open 2009 and top-5 finishes at Acer SA Women's Open 2006, SAS Masters 2008, UNIQA Ladies Golf Open 2008, and Deutsche Bank Ladies Swiss Open 2009.

Professional wins (1)

Ladies European Tour (1)
2008 Open de España Femenino

References

External links
 Golfdata: Emma Zackrisson

Swedish female golfers
Oklahoma State Cowgirls golfers
Ladies European Tour golfers
1979 births
Living people